Thomas/Central Avenue (also known as Midtown Phoenix) is a light rail station on Valley Metro Rail in Phoenix, Arizona, United States. It is the seventh stop southbound and the twenty-second stop northbound on the initial 20 mile starter line.  The station is north of Thomas Road, and it can be accessed from both Thomas Road, at the south, and Catalina Drive, two blocks to the north.  Catalina Drive is the south-boundary street for Park Central Mall.

Ridership

Nearby places
 Park Central Mall
 St. Joseph's Hospital and Medical Center
 Phoenix Plaza

References

External links
 Valley Metro map

Valley Metro Rail stations in Phoenix, Arizona
Railway stations in the United States opened in 2008
2008 establishments in Arizona